Novak Djokovic defeated Rafael Nadal in the final, 6–1, 6–2 to win the singles tennis title at the 2016 ATP Qatar Open.

David Ferrer was the defending champion, but lost in the first round to Illya Marchenko.

Seeds

Draw

Finals

Top half

Bottom half

Qualifying

Seeds

Qualifiers

Qualifying draw

First qualifier

Second qualifier

Third qualifier

Fourth qualifier

References
 Main Draw
 Qualifying Draw

Singles